Korondi is a Hungarian surname. Notable people with the surname include:

Anna Korondi, singer
 (1936–2015), singer, father of Anna Korondi
Margit Korondi (born 1932), gymnast
Miklós Korondi (born 1955), politician

Hungarian-language surnames